Ahmet Esat Tomruk (1892 - 14 February 1966) was a Turkish spy better known as "İngiliz Kemal" [Kemal, the Englishman] in Turkey.

Tomruk was born in 1892 in Istanbul. At the age of five, his father Mehmet Reşit Bey had died, and he continued living with his mother Sıdıka Hanım and his uncle Sezai Bey. Sezai Bey enrolled him in Galatasaray High School where he studied. In his school years he practiced Italian, Greek, English and French by exchanging letters with his foreign friends. During the First World War he worked for the Special Organization of the Ottoman Empire. In the Turkish Independence War he was received by Mustafa Kemal and was ordered to infiltrate an encampment of the Greek Army. Tomruk was featured in the 1952 film "İngiliz Kemal Lawrense Karşı", and the 1968 "Ingiliz Kemal".

References

1892 births
1966 deaths
Galatasaray High School alumni
Members of the Special Organization (Ottoman Empire)
People of the Turkish War of Independence
Spies from Istanbul
Turkish spies
20th-century Ottoman military personnel